The Dictionarium Annamiticum Lusitanum et Latinum (known in Vietnamese as ) is a trilingual Vietnamese-Portuguese-Latin dictionary written by the French Jesuit lexicographer Alexandre de Rhodes after 12 years in Vietnam. It was published by the Propaganda Fide in Rome in 1651, upon Rhodes's visit to Europe, along with his catechism .

Background
Before Rhodes's work, traditional Vietnamese dictionaries showed the correspondences between Chinese characters and Vietnamese chữ Nôm script. From the 17th century, Western missionaries started to devise a romanization system that represented the Vietnamese language to facilitate the propagation of the Christian faith, which culminated in the Dictionarium Annamiticum Lusitanum et Latinum of Alexandre de Rhodes.

Content
The dictionary has 8,000 Vietnamese entries with glosses in Portuguese and Latin. The publication also incorporates a summary on Vietnamese grammar (Linguae Annamiticae seu Tunchinensis Brevis Declaratio) and the codification of some contemporary pronunciations.

Impact
The dictionary established chữ Quốc ngữ, the Vietnamese alphabet, which was refined by later missionaries and eventually became the predominant writing system for Vietnamese. Mgr Pigneau de Béhaine contributed to these improvements with his 1783 Annamite–Latin dictionary, the manuscript of which was remitted to Mgr Jean-Louis Taberd who published in 1838 his Vietnamese–Latin / Latin–Vietnamese dictionary.

Despite those efforts, Christian publications in Vietnam continued to use either Latin or the traditional Vietnamese chữ Nôm, rather than the simpler alphabetic Quốc ngữ, for the next 200 years. Quốc ngữ gained only predominance after the French invasion of 1861 and the establishment of French Indochina.

See also
France-Vietnam relations

Notes

References

External links

Full text of the dictionary

1651 books
Vietnamese Christian texts
Vietnamese dictionaries
Portuguese dictionaries
Latin dictionaries
Jesuit Asia missions
Jesuit publications
Multilingual dictionaries
17th-century Latin books